The superior cerebral veins are several cerebral veins that drain the superolateral and superomedial surfaces of the cerebral hemispheres into the superior sagittal sinus. There are 8-12 cerebral veins. They are predominantly found in the sulci between the gyri, but can also be found running across the gyri.

Anatomy

Fate 
The superior cerebral veins drain into the superior sagittal sinus individually. The anterior veins run at near right angles to the sinus while the posterior and larger veins are directed at oblique angles, opening into the sinus in a direction opposed to the current (anterior to posterior) of the blood contained within it.

Additional images

References

External links
 Diagram

Veins of the head and neck